Grace Harvey is a British Paralympic swimmer, and European and British record holder.

Career
Harvey is a British para-swimmer competing in the S6 SB5 SM6 classification for swimmers with a physical impairment. Grace's home town is Ware. She learnt to swim when aged four and she took it up as a sport to control the symptoms of cerebral palsy which caused her legs to spasm. She decided that she wanted to be an athlete after she watched the 2004 Summer Paralympics. Harvey is supported by National Lottery funding.

Harvey's favourite competition location is Sheffield at the Ponds Forge sports centre. In April 2021 she came first in points in the freestyle swimming where she beat Maisie Summers-Newton into second place. She and Lyndon Longhorne both broke European records and together with Conner Morrison they were all early picks for the delayed 2020 Summer Paralympics by the selectors. Her good friend Alice Tai had to withdraw from the delayed 2020 Summer Paralympics due to an injury to her elbow in June 2021.
While Harvey was training in Japan before the Tokyo games began she (and the BBC) was invited to Suzuka International University where she tried out a robotic walking suit that allowed her to walk for the first time. She found the experience "overwhelming" but later that day she cried realising that this might be the first and last time and that she now knew a pleasure that she had never known, but could now miss.

In August 2022 she won a silver medal at the Commonwealth Games in Birmingham by swimming the Women's 100m Breaststroke SB6.

References

Living people
Paralympic swimmers of Great Britain
Year of birth missing (living people)
Swimmers at the 2020 Summer Paralympics
Medalists at the 2020 Summer Paralympics
Medalists at the World Para Swimming Championships
Paralympic silver medalists for Great Britain
Paralympic medalists in swimming
British female breaststroke swimmers
S6-classified Paralympic swimmers
Swimmers at the 2022 Commonwealth Games
Commonwealth Games medallists in swimming
Commonwealth Games silver medallists for England
Medallists at the 2022 Commonwealth Games